Krishna district is district in the coastal Andhra Region in Indian state of Andhra Pradesh, with Machilipatnam as its administrative headquarters. It is the coastal district of Andhra Pradesh. Machilipatnam is the most populated city in the district. It is surrounded on the east by Bay of Bengal, west by Guntur and north by Eluru and NTR districts and south again by Bay of Bengal. In 2022 Krishna district was divided into Krishna and NTR districts.

Etymology 

Krishna district, with its district headquarters at Machilipatnam was formerly called Machilipatnam district. Later it was renamed as Krishna district, by adding certain Taluks of the abolished Guntur District in 1859 with Machilipatnam with its head. It was named after the Krishna River, the third longest river in India. The river flows through the state of Andhra Pradesh before it empties itself into Bay of Bengal, near Hamsaladevi village of Krishna district.

History 

This history of this region dates back to the 2nd century BCE. The area was ruled by the Satavahanas (230 BCAD 227); Pallavas (AD 340AD 500), Chalukyas (AD 6151070 AD) and later by Cholas, Kakatiyas, Musunuri Nayaks, Reddy dynasty and Gajapati kings of Odisha.

Satavahana period (230 BCAD 227): The Satavahanas ruled this region with headquarters at Srikakulam. Prominent rulers during this period were Srimukha (founder), Gotamiputra Satakarni and Yajnasri Satakarni (last Satavahana king). The Satavahanas imparted more stability and security to the life of the people of the region for more than four centuries. Pallava Kingdom (AD 340AD 500), spread over from Krishna river to Tungabhadra, including Amaravati in the East, Bellary in the West and Kancheepuram in the South with capital cities at venginagar near Eluru and Pithapuram, both in Vengidesa. Bruhitpalayanas, the contemporaries of Pallavas who ruled the district with Koduru as their capital. Vishnukundinas (AD 5th century), are rulers who excavated cave temples at Mogalrajapuram (now in Vijayawada) and Undavalli, etc.

Eastern chalukyas (AD 615AD 1070), the entire Andhra country was under the control of a single ruler under their reign. The Eastern Chalukyas were credited with the excavations of the cave temple at Undavalli and rock cut shrines and Shiva temples.

Cholas ruled this region with capital at Rajamahendri . It was during Rajarajanaredra's reign that Nannayya Bhattu translated the Mahabharata into Telugu. Kakatiyas, ruled this region up to the early 14th century with Orugallu as their capital and followed by Musunuri Nayaks who rebelled against Delhi sultanate and won. Musunuri Nayaks constructed various forts in South India including Hampi and ruled many states of India independently. Reddy dynasty, on the downfall of Pratapa Rudra of Kakatiya, the eldest son of Prolaya Vema reddi, a subordinate of Musunuri Kapaya Naidu found himself independent and established himself in the hill fort of Kondavedu. The Kondavidu Reddi's were great patrons of Telugu literature. The poet Srinadha and his brother-in –law Bammera Pothana flourished at his court. The ruins of fortresses at Kondavidu can be seen

Gajapathis of Odisha: Kapileswara Gajapathi is preserved by the village Kapileswarapuram now in Pamidimukkala mandal. He was succeeded by Vidyadhara Gajapathi who built Vidyadharapuram (now in Vijayawada) and constructed a reservoir at Kondapalli. Krishnadevaraya of Vijayanagara empire conquered this region in the early 16th century. Qutb Shahis, in 1512, the Kingdom of Golconda was founded by one Sultan Quli Qutub Shah. The Kingdom of Golconda included this district within its limits. Abu-l-Hussain Shah was the last of Qutab Shahi dynasty known as Tanisha. He had two ministers, both Brahmins, named Madanna and Akkanna. Popular tradition attributed this preference of Vijayawada to the devotion of the two ministers to the goddess Kanaka Durga.

Medieval period 

The Emperor Aurangazeb included this district in the province of Golconda, which remained under Asaf jah who was appointed as Subedar or Viceroy of the Deccan in AD 1713 with the title of Nizam-ul-Mulk. The province of Golconda comprised five Nawabs’ charges viz. Arcot, Cuddapah, Kurnool, Rajahmundry and Chicacole (Srikakulam). The Nawab of Rajahmundry ruled the country induced in the Krishna district.

The British: In the year 1611 the English founded their settlement at Masulipatnam which was their headquarters until they finally moved to Madras in 1641. The Dutch and French also had settlements at Masulipatnam. Upon the death of the old Nizam-ul-Mulk in June 1748 his heirs strove for the succession with the support of the English and the French. When Nizam Ali Khan was proclaimed ruler of Golconda in 1761 the British secured at first the divisions of Masulipatnam, Nizampatnam and part of Kondaveedu and later the entire Circars. At first the district was administered by a chief and council at Masulipatnam but in 1794 Collectors, directly responsible to the Board of Revenue, were appointed at Masulipatnam.

The Krishna District was formed from the District of Rajahmundry in 1859, when it also included the present day Guntur and West Godavari districts. Guntur was separated from Krishna in 1904, and West Godavari in 1925, giving rise to the present day Krishna district.

Demographics 

 census of India, the district had a population of 4,517,398 with a density of 518 persons per km2. The total population constitute, 2,267,375 males and 2,250,023 females –a ratio of 992 females per 1000 males. The total urban population is  (40.81%). There are  literates with a literacy rate of 73.74%.

After reorganization the district had a population of 17,35,079, of which 482,513 (27.81%) live in urban areas. Krishna district has a sex ratio of 996 females per 1000 males and a literacy rate of 73.75%. Scheduled Castes and Scheduled Tribes make up 346,989 (20.00%) and 37,716 (2.17%) of the population respectively.

According to the 2011 census, 93.30% of the population spoke Telugu and 5.97% Urdu as their first language.

Geography 

Krishna district is surrounded on the east by Bay of Bengal, west by Guntur and Bapatla districts and north by Eluru and NTR districts and south by Bay of Bengal.

Topography 

The main hill range of the district known as Kondapalli runs between Nandigama and Vijayawada with a length of about 24 km. The other smaller hill ranges are Jammalavoidurgam, Mogalrajapuram and Indrakiladri hills. Kolleru, is the large freshwater lake in India. It spans into two districts – Krishna and West Godavari.

Flora and fauna 

The forest occupies only 9 percent of the total district area. However, it contains Reserved Forest areas in Nandigama, Vijayawada, Tiruvuru, Nuzvid, Gannavaram, Machilipatnam and Divi Seema Talukas. A type of light wood known as ‘Ponuku’ (Gyrocapus Jacquini) is found in the Kondapalli hills. The wood is used for the manufacture of the well known Kondpalli toys. The most noticeable trees are pterocarpus, Terminalia, Anogeissus and Logustroeinai and Casuarina.

Panthers, hyenas, jungle cats, foxes, bears and other carnivorous mammalian fauna are found here. Deer, spotted deer sambar, blackbuck and other herbivorous animals are found in the inland forests. The district has a large number of Murrah buffaloes and cows.

Climate 

The climatic conditions of the district consist of extremely hot summers and moderately hot winters and may be classified as tropical. The period starting from April to June is the hottest. The annual rainfall in the region is about 1028 mm and is contributed to by the Southwest monsoon. Three types of soils viz., Black Cotton (57.6 percent), Sand clay loams (22.3 percent) and Red loams (19.4 percent).

Economy 

The primary, secondary and tertiary sectors of the district contribute ,  and  respectively.

The major products contributing to the GVA of the district from agriculture and allied services are, paddy, sugarcane, mango, tomato, milk, meat and fisheries. The GVA to the industrial and service sector is contributed from construction, electricity, manufacturing, transport and software services.

Administrative divisions 

The district has three revenue divisions, namely Machilipatnam, Gudivada and Vuyyuru, each headed by a sub collector. These revenue divisions are divided into 26 mandals in the district. These 26 mandals consist of unknown number of mandal parishads, unknown number of panchayats, unknown number of villages and 3 municipalities. There are unknown number of towns (or urban settlements) in the district, including 1 municipal corporation, 3 municipalities, unknown number of nagar panchayat and unknown number of census towns. Machilipatnam is the only municipal corporation and the 3 municipalities in the district are Gudivada, Pedana and Vuyyuru. The unknown number of census towns are TBA.

Mandals 

The list of 26 mandals in Krishna district under 3 revenue divisions are listed in the following table:

Politics 
The Parliamentary constituency is Machilipatnam Lok Sabha constituency

The Assembly segment comprises the following Legislative Assembly segments:

Source: Assembly segments of Parliamentary constituencies

Erstwhile Talukas 

 Before Formation of mandals, Administration was done through Taluka system
 Krishna District had 10 Talukas in 1971, later in 1978 they were increased to 21 Talukas
 In 1985, Mandal system was created and 50 mandals were formed in the district
 In 2022, Krishna district was divided into two districts forming NTR district which left Krishna district with 25 mandals

Towns in district 

Note -

** Vijayawada Population shown here is only, Municipal Corporation Population.

** Vijayawada Urban Agglomeration Population is 14,76,931

Villages 
 

Mulalanka
Nimmaluru

Politics 

Krishna district has one parliamentary constituency namely Machilipatnam. There are seven assembly constituencies namely, Gannavaram, Gudivada, Pedana, Machilipatnam, Avanigadda, Pamarru (SC), Penamaluru. Telugu Desam Party, Jana Sena party, YSR Congress, Bharatiya Janata Party, Lok Satta, CPI and CPM are the main political parties in the district.

Culture 

The culture of Krishna district is mostly traditional in rural places and moderately modern in Gudivada and Machilipatnam. It is also famous as the birthplace for Indian classical dance named Kuchipudi and the culture with the dialect of Telugu spoken in Krishna is widely considered to be the standard form of Telugu.

Transport

Road 
The District is well served by Roads and Railways. 502 villages (including some of the major hamlets) have been connected with transport facilities. Four national highways pass through the district namely NH16 from Chennai to Kolkata, NH 65 from Pune to Machilipatnam, NH165 from Pamarru to Palakollu, NH216 from Ongole to Kathipudi.

APSRTC is the major road transport corporation, operates Bus services from District headquarters Machilipatnam to Vijayawada, Eluru, Hanuman Junction, Gudivada, Avanigadda, Repalle, Kakinada, Narsapuram, Bhimavaram, Visakhapatnam, Srikakulam, Palasa, Palakonda, Parvathipuram, Rajahmundry.

Rail 
There exists  of rail network in the district. Gudivada Junction railway station is the major railway junction in the district and Machilipatnam railway station is the major railway station in the district.

Water 
A minor sea port is at Machilipatnam.

Air 
Krishna district is served by Vijayawada International airport located in Gannavaram.

Education 
The primary and secondary school education is imparted by government, aided and private schools, under the School Education Department of the state. As per the school information report for the academic year 2015–16, there are a total of 4,449 schools. They include, 15 government, 2,432 mandal and zilla parishads, 3 residential, 1748 private, 2 model, 3 Kasturba Gandhi Balika Vidyalaya (KGBV), 180 municipal and 66 other types of schools. The total number of students enrolled in primary, upper primary and high schools of the district are 562,510.

Dr.Gururaju Government Homoeo Medical college and Regional Research Institute for Homoeopathy are located in Gudivada. Krishna University is located in Machilipatnam. Rajiv Gandhi University of Knowledge Technologies, Nuzvid is situated in Nuzvid. School of Planning and Architecture is present in Gudavalli.

District has numerous engineering colleges including Prasad V. Potluri Siddhartha Institute of Technology, Velagapudi Ramakrishna Siddhartha Engineering College, Lakireddy Bali Reddy Engineering College, Gudlavalleru Engineering College, DMS SVH College of Engineering, SRR & CVR Govt. Degree College is one of the oldest colleges. It was established in 1937. Govt Polytechnic Vijayawada (one of the oldest Polytechnic colleges in India), Andhra Loyola College, AANM & VVRSR (Gudlavalleru) Polytechnic College, Mary Stella college, Sidhartha Degree College are a few of the many famous arts and science colleges in the district.

Sports 

Kabbadi is the most popular sport, followed by cricket, volleyball, badminton, basketball and tennis.

Indira Gandhi Municipal Stadium in Vijayawada hosts One Day Internationals Cricket matches of India. Only one international cricket match was played between India and West Indies on 24 November 2002 at Indira Gandhi stadium. It was won by West Indies. On 12 December 1997 Women's Cricket Worldcup only a group match was played between England Women's Cricket Team and Pakistan women's cricket team, and it was won by England. Dandamudi Rajagopal Indoor Stadium in Vijayawada .

NTR Stadium is the main sports venue in Gudivada. It is used for several sports, like athletics, volleyball, cricket practice, kho kho, kabaddi, badminton, tennis and basketball. Famous Hockey player Balram belongs to this District.

It is also the stadium for Krishna District Cricket Association. Mangalagiri International Cricket Stadium is being built in a  site in Navuluru, village of Mangalagiri town, Guntur district, about 15 km from the city of Vijayawada. The exclusive stadium of the Andhra Cricket Association will be the venue for international and Ranji matches.

Notable people 
Many notable people are associated with this district, including:

Science and technology

Fine arts and literature

Social reformers

Sports

Cinema

See also 

 Coastal Andhra
 List of villages in Krishna district

References

External links 

 
 Krishna district marked on OpenStreetMap

 
1859 establishments in India
Districts of Andhra Pradesh